Glenn Meldrum (8 October 1986 in Melbourne, Australia) is a retired Australian actor best known for his role as Phil Marsten #1 on "The Saddle Club". He taught English at Heidelberg International School in Germany. He eventually moved to Canada. Glenn Meldrum has since moved back to Australia. Glenn now works as a barristers clerk at Meldrum and Hyland List Barristers' Clerk. He briefly worked as a photographer, reservation agent, driver and dog walker.

Filmography
Blue Heelers – Todd Gilmore (1 episode, 2003)
The Saddle Club – Phillip "Phil" Marsten #1 (2001–2003)
The Wog Boy (2000) – Clayton
The Genie From Down Under (1996) – Baz

References

External links

Meldrum and Hyland Barristers Clerk
Glenn Meldrum on LinkedIn

Australian male film actors
Australian male television actors
Australian male child actors
Male actors from Melbourne
Teachers of English as a second or foreign language
Living people
1986 births
Australian schoolteachers